Pure Trash is the second solo studio album by American multi-instrumentalist Dosh. It was released on Anticon on October 11, 2004. It peaked at number 74 on the CMJ Top 200 chart.

Critical reception
Mike Diver of Drowned in Sound gave the album a 7 out of 10, saying: "If there's a single criticism that can be genuinely levelled at this album, it's that it's a little too nice." Frosty of XLR8R called it "a splendid ode to staying home."

Track listing

References

External links
 

2002 albums
Dosh albums
Anticon albums